"All About Mormons", also known as "All About the Mormons?", is the 12th episode of the seventh season of the American animated television series South Park, and the 108th overall episode of the series. It was originally broadcast on Comedy Central in the United States on November 19, 2003. The episode revolves around the religion and culture of Mormons, as a Mormon family moves to the town of South Park, and influences the beliefs of the family of character Stan Marsh. The story of Joseph Smith's founding of Mormonism and the origin of the Book of Mormon is told through a number of comedic 19th-century flashbacks, with a musical narration.

The episode was written and directed by series co-creator Trey Parker, and was rated TV-MA in the United States. The episode evolved from personal experiences of creators Parker and Matt Stone, who grew up in Colorado. Growing up in Colorado both Stone and Parker often visited Utah, and both had Mormon classmates. The scene in which Stan is invited to dinner by the Mormon family was inspired by Parker's first girlfriend in high school, who was Mormon and invited him over for Family Home Evening. They found the religion ridiculous but hard to parody due to the good-natured attitudes of many Mormons. 

The episode received positive reviews from television critics, and has been placed on "best-of" South Park lists. Parker found that younger audiences found the episode unfunny, but many of his Mormon friends found it hilarious. "All About Mormons" was released on DVD along with the rest of the seventh season on March 21, 2006. Parker and Stone later carried over many themes from the episode for their musical The Book of Mormon, which opened on Broadway in 2011.

Plot
A new family, the Harrisons, move into South Park, and their son, Gary, stereotypically depicted as unusually perfect (achieving high grades, being state champion in sports, being perfectly polite, etc.), invokes the wrath of the other boys. Stan is drafted into the job of beating him up by the other children, but Gary's sheer politeness leads Stan to discover himself walking away with an invitation to dinner that night.  Stan meets Gary's family, an overly friendly, loving, talented family (including a very articulate infant). After dinner, the five-child, two-parent family has "Family Home Evening" where they play games, do performance art and read from the Book of Mormon. Stan is intrigued and confused by all this, and asks his parents about the Mormon family's beliefs. Randy (his father) concludes that they must be religious fanatics attempting to brainwash Stan, and heads over to confront Mr. Harrison and beat him up. Instead, he too finds himself quelled by the family's perfection and politeness, and in the end, actually decides to convert to Mormonism himself. The next day, Kenny, Cartman and Kyle cruelly mock Stan for hanging around with Gary and his family, accusing Stan of going on a date with Gary. When the Harrisons and Gary show up, the three children walk off lying about going to "put in some volunteer work at the homeless shelter".

Throughout the episode, characters ask questions about Mormonism, and the story then breaks off to a sub-story about Joseph Smith and the founding of the religion. For satirical purposes, the show deviates from the original accounts of Mormonism's founding by adding extra details to stories originally left vague (e.g. the precise location where Martin Harris lost the only transcript of the Book of Lehi given to him by Joseph Smith); furthermore, during the narration, an upbeat tune plays in the background, with a choral "Dum, dum, dum, dum, dum" following the lyrical lines of the song. When skeptic Lucy Harris appears in the sub-story, the chorus changes to "Smart, smart, smart, smart, smart", and it becomes clear that the voices are actually singing "Dumb, dumb, dumb, dumb, dumb" after the specifics of Smith's story. The show asserts flaws in the religion's founding, which especially concern Stan (for example, that Joseph Smith offered no proof to the general public of finding the golden plates, and that he claimed to have translated from a slightly different plate after the first translation was lost while in the possession of Martin Harris). Stan ends up shouting at the Mormons that they are ridiculous for believing in it without proof; they smile and patiently explain that it is a matter of faith, while Stan argues that it should be a matter of empirical evidence. He further lashes out at them for acting unusually nice all the time, claiming it blindsides stupid people like his father into believing in Mormonism (to which Randy Marsh responds with a determined "Yeah!").

Stan's anger does not upset anyone in the Mormon family other than Gary, who confronts Stan and the other boys the next day, pointing out that he believes his religion does not need to be factually true, but it still supports good family values and helping the poor.  Gary also condemns their bigotry and ignorance in language that is normal for the main characters but extremely surprising and powerful coming from Gary, as he ends his dialogue telling Stan to "suck my balls". He walks away, leaving the boys in utter shock. The episode ends as Cartman, with a new-found respect for Gary, says "Damn, that kid is cool, huh?".

Production
The episode was written and directed by South Park co-creator Trey Parker. The character of the new Mormon student Gary is voiced by South Park writer Kyle McCulloch, who himself grew up Mormon.

Growing up in Colorado, Parker and Stone knew a lot of Mormon people, and Parker's high school ex-girlfriend was a Mormon, whose family he has visited while they held Family Home Evening. Through these experiences, Parker learned a number of things about the religion, and did more research for his film Orgazmo, in which he played the Mormon main character.

Reception
Cameron Adams of the Herald Sun, a tabloid Australian newspaper, highlighted the episode among "Top Choice" picks in television. Chris Quinn of the San Antonio Express-News placed the episode at number 7 on his list of "Top 10 Most Offensive South Park Episodes and Therefore, Maybe The Best, List". In 2013, fans voted the episode as the best of the 7th season. The episode was used as an exhibit in discussing Mormonism in popular culture by Utah Valley State College religious studies professor Kelli Potter in a presentation titled "The Americanization of Mormonism Reflected in Pop Culture". KUER's Radio West host Doug Fabrizio used the episode as a case study in a discussion about "Mormonism and Popular Culture".

See also

Criticism of the Church of Jesus Christ of Latter-day Saints
First Vision
The Book of Mormon (musical)

References

External links
 "All About Mormons" Full episode at South Park Studios
 

Criticism of Mormonism
Mormonism in fiction
Cultural depictions of Joseph Smith
Television episodes about Christianity
South Park (season 7) episodes